An unmanned surveillance and reconnaissance aerial vehicle, is an unarmed military UAV that is used for intelligence, surveillance, target acquisition, and reconnaissance (ISTAR).
Unlike unmanned combat aerial vehicle (UCAV), this type of system is not designed to carry aircraft ordnance such as missiles, ATGMs, or bombs for drone strikes. The main purpose is to provide battlefield intelligence. Small sized short-range man-portable unmanned aerial vehicles are called miniature UAV also used for battlefield intelligence.
s

Current models

Future models and technology demonstrators

Belgium
The Belgians were early adopters of reconnaissance UAVs, introducing the "Epervier (Sparrowhawk)" UAV in the early 1970s. It was built by Manufacture Belge De Lampes Et De Materiel Electronique SA (MBLE) of Belgium. Epervier prototypes were propeller-driven, but the production Epervier UAV, the "X.5" model, was fitted with a Rover TJ125 turbojet with 510 N (52 kgf / 114 lbf) thrust. It was launched by a RATO booster and recovered by parachute.

It had a boxy fiberglass fuselage with a rear-mounted truncated-delta wing, a single tailfin, and winglet fins at the end of each wing.

Croatia
Croatia has fielded a series of tactical UAVs, beginning with the MAH-1 in early 1993 built by Igor Pongrac. Later on Israels IAI Malat tactical UAVs were built and developed on behalf MAH-1.

France
Matra BAe Dynamics developed a UAV named "Dragon". The Dragon was roughly the same size as and similar to the SAGEM Crecerelle, with the same pusher-prop delta configuration, except that instead of having a single tailfin mounted on the fuselage, the Dragon had a tailfin on each wingtip. It was intended as a jamming platform. It seems to have dropped out of sight, possibly because the French Army acquired the Crecerelle for the jamming mission.

Georgia
Georgia's defence research center developed a series of small for infantry purpose unmanned areal vehicles, including multiple fixed-rotor variants. After a financial dispute with Israel over the delivery of UAV systems, the center in cooperation with TAM started to develop new medium-sized drones which would compensate the need of modern systems equipped with latest technology. Even though these projects are still in development stage, one variant was exposed in April, 2012.

Pakistan
Pakistan developed a number of reconnaissance UAVs. Pakistan's "Air Weapons Complex (AWC)" has completed development of their "Bravo" battlefield surveillance UAV, and is now in service with law enforcement and border security organizations. It is guided by a preprogrammed navigation system. The AWC "Vision-1" is an improved version of the Bravo, and AWC also makes a high-altitude reconnaissance drone, the "Vector", as well as two target drones, the "Nishan" and the "Hornet".

Russia
Yakovlev is currently working on two new tactical UAVs:
 The "Albatros" is a tiltrotor design along the lines of the Bell Eagle Eye, except that it has an inverted-vee tail. It will have a  engine, seven-hour endurance. It is primarily focused on shipboard applications.
 Details of the "Expert" are unclear, but it appears to be a small battlefield surveillance UAV, of the sort usually launched by a bungee catapult.

Turkey

Bayraktar TB1
Bayraktar TB1 (or Bayraktar Çaldıran) is the prototype UAV, made for the Tactical UAV program of the Undersecretariat for Defence Industries (Savunma Sanayii Mustesarligi or SSM; now the Presidency of Defense Industries) of Turkey, started in 2007. SSM invited two companies to compete for a prototype demonstration phase of the Tactical UAS Program. In 2009, Kale-Baykar, a joint venture between the Kale Group and Baykar Technologies, demonstrated Block A (named Bayraktar Çaldıran) with its dual redundant avionics system and fully autonomous takeoff and landing capability. The aircraft was selected as the winner of the program. While the contract was signed with the Presidency of Defense Industries for Bayraktar TB1s, these products were not delivered and remained as prototypes for Bayraktar Block 2s. Instead, serial production commenced with Baykar Bayraktar TB2.

Multinational
 EADS Orka: The European Aeronautic Defence and Space Company (EADS) company is currently promoting a number of UAVs. It is currently favoured as the likely replacement for the larger and heavier SEAMOS helicopter UAV that was abandoned by the Germans. The Orka is derived from a light helicopter the Cabri built by Hélicoptères Guimbal of France. There is a sensor turret under the nose and an antenna or sensor drum under the belly between the landing skids.
 EADS Scorpio: The EADS "Scorpio" is a much smaller reconnaissance helicopter UAV, focused on special operations. It is also of conventional helicopter configuration, with a two-blade main rotor with Hiller-type stabilization paddles, an exposed two-blade tail rotor, and landing skids. A sensor turret may be fitted between the landing skids. There are several variants in the Scorpio line.

References